James Herbert Lloyd Morrell (called Lloyd; 12 August 190728 March 1996) was the seventh Bishop of Lewes.

Biography 
Morrell was educated at Dulwich College and King's College London. He was deaconed on Trinity Sunday 1931 (31 May) and priested the following Trinity Sunday (22 May 1932) — both times by Arthur Winnington-Ingram, Bishop of London, at St Paul's Cathedral. He began his career with curacies at St Alphage, Hendon and St Michael & All Angels, Brighton after which he was chaplain to George Bell, Bishop of Chichester and then a Lecturer for The Church of England Moral Welfare Council. From here he went to be Vicar of Roffey and then Archdeacon of Lewes before appointment to the Episcopate in 1959, serving eventually for eighteen years. He was consecrated a bishop on 30 November 1959, by Geoffrey Fisher, Archbishop of Canterbury, at Westminster Abbey.

References

1907 births
People educated at Dulwich College
Alumni of King's College London
Fellows of King's College London
Bishops of Lewes
Archdeacons of Lewes
1996 deaths
20th-century Church of England bishops